Imesse Airport  is an airport serving Imesse, Democratic Republic of the Congo. It is located near the Ubangi River near the border with the Republic of Congo.

References

Airports in Sud-Ubangi